D44, D-44 or D.44 may refer to:

 85 mm divisional gun D-44, a Soviet artillery gun
 Aero D-44, a German military transport aircraft
 D44 road (Croatia)
 , a Danae-class cruiser of the Royal Navy
 , a I-class destroyer of the Royal Navy
 , a Battle-class destroyer of the Royal Navy
 Digital Forty Four, an Australian datacasting service 
 Semi-Slav Defence, a chess opening